This is a list of events in animation in 2019.

Events

January
 January 13: The Family Guy episode "Trump Guy" first airs, in which the Griffin family meet U.S. President Donald Trump. The episode became controversial for satirizing Trump and his administration.
 January 21: The final episode of Steven Universe, "Change Your Mind", airs.

February
 February 22: How to Train Your Dragon: The Hidden World, the third and final film of the How to Train Your Dragon franchise, releases to theatres to critical acclaim.
 February 24: 
91st Academy Awards: 
 Spider-Man: Into the Spider-Verse by Bob Persichetti, Peter Ramsey, Rodney Rothman, Phil Lord and Christopher Miller wins the Academy Award for Best Animated Feature, becoming the first non-Disney film since 2012 to do so.
 Bao by Domee Shi and Becky Neiman-Cobb wins the Academy Award for Best Animated Short.
 Urbanus, De Vuilnisheld, an animated film based on the Flemish comic strip Urbanus, premieres.

March
 March 3: The Simpsons episode "101 Mitigations" premieres, guest starring Guillermo del Toro.
 March 8: Following the release of the controversial 2019 documentary film Leaving Neverland, which details allegations against the late pop singer Michael Jackson of child sexual assault, The Simpsons producer James L. Brooks announces that the Simpsons episode "Stark Raving Dad", which guest starred Jackson, will be pulled from circulation. He explains to The Wall Street Journal: "This was a treasured episode. There are a lot of great memories we have wrapped up in that one, and this certainly doesn't allow them to remain. I'm against book-burning of any kind. But this is our book, and we're allowed to take out a chapter." Simpsons showrunner Al Jean says he believed Jackson had used the episode to groom boys for sexual abuse.
 March 18: The first episode of 101 Dalmatian Street is broadcast. It is the second television show based on the 101 Dalmatians franchise, following 101 Dalmatians: The Series from 1997.
 March 20: The soundtrack of Schoolhouse Rock! is added to the National Recording Registry.

April
 April 28: The Simpsons episode "D'oh Canada" premieres, where the family travels to Canada. The episode caused controversy among New Yorkers because of a satirical parody song mocking the city.

May
 May 12: The Simpsons episode "Crystal Blue-Haired Persuasion" episode premieres, guest starring Werner Herzog.
 May 24: The Aladdin remake is released to theatres to mixed reviews from critics.

June
 June 17: The first episode of Amphibia is broadcast to positive reviews.
 June 24: The final episode of the original The Amazing World of Gumball series, "The Inquisition", premieres to mixed reviews due to the series ending on a unresolved cliffhanger. However, a feature film based on the series was announced in 2021.

July
 July 12:
SpongeBob SquarePants celebrates its 20th Anniversary with a television special titled SpongeBob's Big Birthday Blowout premiering on Nickelodeon to positive reviews.
 July 18: 
 An arson attack at the Japanese studio Kyoto Animation results in 36 deaths and 33 injuries. The arson is one of the deadliest in Japanese history since the end of World War II; a majority of the victims are women. Among the victims are director Yasuhiro Takemoto, character designer Futoshi Nishiya, animator Yoshiji Kigami, and color designer Naomi Ishida. The late Japanese Prime Minister Shinzo Abe expresses his condolences, as do other world leaders including Canadian Prime Minister Justin Trudeau, Taiwanese President Tsai Ing-wen, and Secretary-General of the United Nations António Guterres. An outpouring of support for the victims and their families results in more than $30 million in donations from domestic Japanese sources, with an estimated additional $2.3 million in donations from international donors.
 The season 1 finale of Amphibia, titled "Reunion", premieres to critical acclaim.
 July 19: 
 Molly of Denali premieres on PBS Kids to high acclaim. It is the first children's animated series with an Alaska Native as the lead character.
 The Lion King remake, produced by Fairview Entertainment, is released to theaters with mixed reviews from critics. It is currently the highest-grossing animated film of all time.

August
 August 9: Rocko's Modern Life: Static Cling, a revival movie based on Rocko's Modern Life, premiered on Netflix to critical acclaim.
 August 14: The Angry Birds Movie 2 is released. It is the highest-rated animated film based on a video game, with a 74% score on Rotten Tomatoes.
 August 16: Invader Zim: Enter the Florpus, a revival movie based on Invader Zim, premiered on Netflix to high critical acclaim, with a 100% score on Rotten Tomatoes.

September
September 2: Steven Universe: The Movie, a sequel television musical film based on Steven Universe, premiered on Cartoon Network to critical acclaim.
 September 27: The 5th season of Bubble Guppies premiered on Nickelodeon almost 3 years after the finale of the show's original run.

October
 October 4: South Park is banned in China after the episode "Band in China" mocked the country and its government. Parker and Stone issued a sarcastic apology in response.
 October 12: After nine years on the air, My Little Pony: Friendship Is Magic airs its final episode on Discovery Family.
 October 13:
The season 1 finale of Bluey titled, "Daddy Putdown", premieres to universal acclaim.
The Simpsons episode "The Fat Blue Line" premieres, guest starring actor Jason Momoa.
 October 14: The Casagrandes, a spinoff of The Loud House premieres on Nickelodeon.

November
 November 3: The Simpsons episode "Gorillas on the Mast" premieres, guest starring biologist Jane Goodall.
 November 8: 
Green Eggs and Ham premieres its first season on Netflix to positive reviews. A second season, which is the final season, was released in 2022.
Klaus premiered on Netflix.
 November 10: Grey DeLisle replaces Russi Taylor as the voice of Martin Prince, Sherri and Terri on The Simpsons starting with the episode "Marge the Lumberjill" due to the latter's death on July 26, 2019.
 November 11: Blue's Clues & You!, a revival of the original Blue's Clues premieres on Nickelodeon.
 November 17: The Simpsons episode "Livin La Pura Vida" premieres, in which the family travels to Costa Rica.
 November 22: Disney releases Frozen II.
 November 24: The Simpsons episode "Thanksgiving of Horror" premieres, guest starring Black Mirror creator Charlie Brooker. This was also the last episode featuring Russi Taylor as Martin Prince recorded before her death on July 26, 2019, although Grey DeLisle already took over that character a few episodes prior due to "Thanksgiving of Horror" being a leftover episode from the previous season.

December
 December 7: Steven Universe Future, a limited epilogue series based on Steven Universe premiered on Cartoon Network to critical acclaim.
 December 11: Walt Disney's Sleeping Beauty is added to the National Film Registry.
 December 15: The Simpsons episode "Bobby, It's Cold Outside" premieres, guest starring businessman Steve Ballmer.
 December 25: Spies in Disguise is released as the final Blue Sky Studios film before their shutdown in April 2021.

Awards
 Academy Award for Best Animated Feature: Spider-Man: Into the Spider-Verse
 Academy Award for Best Animated Short Film: Bao
 American Cinema Editors Award for Best Edited Animated Feature Film: Spider-Man: Into the Spider-Verse
 Annecy International Animated Film Festival Cristal du long métrage: I Lost My Body
 Annie Award for Best Animated Feature: Klaus
 Annie Award for Best Animated Feature — Independent: I Lost My Body
 Asia Pacific Screen Award for Best Animated Feature Film: Rezo
 BAFTA Award for Best Animated Film: Spider-Man: Into the Spider-Verse
 César Award for Best Animated Film: Dilili in Paris
 Chicago Film Critics Association Award for Best Animated Film: Spider-Man: Into the Spider-Verse
 Critics' Choice Movie Award for Best Animated Feature: Toy Story 4
 Dallas–Fort Worth Film Critics Association Award for Best Animated Film: Isle of Dogs
 European Film Award for Best Animated Feature Film: I Lost My Body
 Florida Film Critics Circle Award for Best Animated Film: I Lost My Body
 Golden Globe Award for Best Animated Feature Film: Missing Link
 Golden Reel Awards: Spider-Man: Into the Spider-Verse
 Goya Award for Best Animated Film: Buñuel in the Labyrinth of the Turtles
 Hollywood Animation Award: Toy Story 4
 Japan Academy Film Prize for Animation of the Year: Mirai
 Kids' Choice Award for Favorite Animated Movie: Incredibles 2
 Los Angeles Film Critics Association Award for Best Animated Film: I Lost My Body
 Mainichi Film Award for Best Animation Film: Children of the Sea
 National Board of Review Award for Best Animated Film: How to Train Your Dragon: The Hidden World
 New York Film Critics Circle Award for Best Animated Film: I Lost My Body
 Online Film Critics Society Award for Best Animated Film: Toy Story 4
 Producers Guild of America Award for Best Animated Motion Picture: Spider-Man: Into the Spider-Verse
 San Diego Film Critics Society Award for Best Animated Film: I Lost My Body
 San Francisco Film Critics Circle Award for Best Animated Feature: I Lost My Body
 Saturn Award for Best Animated Film: Spider-Man: Into the Spider-Verse
 St. Louis Gateway Film Critics Association Award for Best Animated Film: Toy Story 4
 Tokyo Anime Award: Detective Conan: Zero the Enforcer and Zombieland Saga
 Toronto Film Critics Association Award for Best Animated Film: Missing Link
 Visual Effects Society Award for Outstanding Visual Effects in an Animated Feature: Missing Link
 Washington D.C. Area Film Critics Association Award for Best Animated Feature: Toy Story 4

Film released

 January 4:
 Lotte and the Lost Dragons (Latvia and Estonia)
 Love Live! Sunshine!! The School Idol Movie: Over the Rainbow (Japan)
 January 11 - White Snake (China)
 January 12 - Fate/stay night: Heaven's Feel II. Lost Butterfly (Japan)
 January 13 - Reign of the Supermen (United States)
 January 18 - Brave Rabbit 3: the Crazy Time Machine (China)
 January 24 - Sheep and Wolves: Pig Deal (Russia)
 February 5:
 Boonie Bears: Blast Into the Past (China)
 Scooby-Doo! and the Curse of the 13th Ghost (United States)
 February 8: 
 City Hunter the Movie: Shinjuku Private Eyes (Japan)
 The Lego Movie 2: The Second Part (United States, Australia, and Denmark)
 February 9 - Code Geass: Lelouch of the Re;surrection (Japan)
 February 21 - The Test of Time (Netherlands)
 February 22 - How to Train Your Dragon: The Hidden World (United States)
 February 27 - Urbanus: Cash for Trash (Belgium and Netherlands)
 February 28 - Birds of a Feather (Germany)
 March 1 - Doraemon: Nobita's Chronicle of the Moon Exploration (Japan)
 March 15: 
 Osomatsu-san the Movie (Japan)
 Wonder Park (United States and Spain)
 March 21 - Upin & Ipin: Keris Siamang Tunggal (Malaysia)
 March 28 - Princess Emmy (France, Germany, Belgium, and United Kingdom)
 March 29 - Dumbo (United States)
 March 30 - Justice League vs. the Fatal Five (United States)
 April 3:
 Astro Kid (France)
 The Queen's Corgi (Belgium)
 April 12:
 The Big Trip (Russia and United States)
 Detective Conan: The Fist of Blue Sapphire (Japan)
 Missing Link (United States)
 April 18 - The Pilgrim's Progress (United States)
 April 19 - Sound! Euphonium The Movie: Oath's Finale (Japan)
 April 26 - The Wonderland (Japan)
 May 1 - Bayala: A Magical Adventure (Germany and Luxembourg)
 May 3:
 Detective Pikachu (United States and Japan)
 UglyDolls (United States)
 May 10 - Chhota Bheem: Kung Fu Dhamaka (India)
 May 14 - Batman vs. Teenage Mutant Ninja Turtles (United States)
 May 24 - Promare (Japan)
 June 4 - Away (Latvia)
 June 7:
 Children of the Sea (Japan)
 The Secret Life of Pets 2 (United States)
 June 10 - Marona's Fantastic Tale (France)
 June 11 - Norm of the North: King Sized Adventure (United States)
 June 14 - Spycies (China and France)
 June 15 - Girls und Panzer das Finale: Part 2 (Japan)
 June 21:
 Ride Your Wave (Japan)
 Toy Story 4 (United States)
 July 5:
 Elcano & Magellan: The First Voyage Around the World (Spain)
 GG Bond: Lollipop in Fantasy (China)
 July 12 - Mewtwo Strikes Back: Evolution (Japan)
 July 16 - Dragon Quest: Your Story (Japan)
 July 19: 
 The Lion King (United States)
 Weathering with You (Japan)
 July 20 - Batman: Hush (United States)
 July 25 - Red Shoes and the Seven Dwarfs (South Korea)
 July 26 - Ne Zha (China)
 August 2 - The Angry Birds Movie 2 (United States and Finland)
 August 6 - The Swan Princess: Kingdom of Music (United States)
 August 7 - Playmobil: The Movie (Canada, France, and Germany)
 August 8:
 BoBoiBoy Movie 2 (Malaysia)
 Trouble (United States)
 August 9:
 One Piece: Stampede (Japan)
 Rocko's Modern Life: Static Cling (United States)
 August 16 - Invader Zim: Enter the Florpus (United States)
 August 20 - Lego DC Batman: Family Matters (United States)
 August 23 - Ni no Kuni (Japan)
 August 28 - Bombay Rose (India)
 September 2 - Steven Universe: The Movie (United States)
 September 3 - Scooby-Doo! Return to Zombie Island (United States)
 September 4 - The Swallows of Kabul (France) 
 September 7 - The Legend of Hei (China)
 September 10 - Curious George: Royal Monkey (United States)
 September 19:
 Hello World (Japan)
 The Knight and the Princess (Egypt)
 September 21 - Turu, the Wacky Hen (Spain and Argentina)
 September 23 - Princess Principal 2: Episode 1 (Japan)
 September 24 - Teen Titans Go! vs. Teen Titans (United States)
 September 26 - On-Gaku: Our Sound (Japan)
 September 27:
 Abominable (United States and China)
 Kiangnan 1894 (China)
 The Old Man (Estonia)
 September 30 - Fritzi – A Revolutionary Tale (Germany)
 October 1:
 Jacob, Mimmi and the Talking Dogs (Latvia and Poland)
 Master Jiang and the Six Kingdoms (China)
 October 2 - Hello World! (France)
 October 3 - The Kuflis 2 (Hungary)
 October 4 - Kral Şakir: Korsanlar Diyari (Turkey)
 October 5 - Wonder Woman: Bloodlines (United States)
 October 8 - The Elfkins – Baking a Difference (Germany)
 October 9 - The Bears' Famous Invasion of Sicily (France and Italy)
 October 10 - Mosley (New Zealand)
 October 11 - The Addams Family (United States and Canada)
 October 18 - A Shaun the Sheep Movie: Farmageddon (United Kingdom)
 October 20 - Boxi and the Lost Treasure (Hungary)
 October 24 - Fantastic Return to Oz (Russia)
 October 26 - Clara (Ukraine)
 October 30 - Salma's Big Wish (Mexico)
 November 1 - Arctic Dogs (Canada and United Kingdom)
 November 6 - I Lost My Body (France)
 November 8 - Klaus (Spain and United States)
 November 22 - Frozen II (United States)
 November 28 - Ejen Ali: The Movie (Malaysia)
 December - Dajjal The Slayer and His Followers (Pakistan, United Kingdom, Turkey, Malaysia, Indonesia, and Jordan)
 December 4 - The Prince's Voyage (France and Luxembourg)
 December 6: 
 Lupin III: The First (Japan)
 StarDog and TurboCat (United Kingdom)
 December 7 - SamSam (France and Belgium)
 December 16 - Foodiverse (China)
 December 19 - Fixies Vs. Crabots (Russia)
 December 25: 
 Latte and the Magic Waterstone (Germany and Belgium)
 Spies in Disguise (United States)
 December 26 - Ivan Tsarevich and the Gray Wolf 4 (Russia)
 Specific date unknown:
 Arkie (Canada and Australia)
 Nimuendajú (Brazil, France, and Germany)

Television series debuts

Television series endings

Deaths

January
 January 2: Bob Einstein, American actor, comedy writer and producer (voice of Super Dave Osborne in Super Dave: Daredevil for Hire, Elephant Trainer and The Bookie in The Life & Times of Tim, Stuff in Strange Magic), dies from cancer at age 76.
 January 15: 
 Carol Channing, American actress and singer (voice of Grandmama in The Addams Family, Mehitabel in Shinbone Alley, Canina Lafur in Chip 'n Dale: Rescue Rangers, Muddy in Happily Ever After, Ms. Fieldmouse in Thumbelina, Fanny in The Brave Little Toaster Goes to Mars, Witch in the 2 Stupid Dogs episode "Red Strikes Back", Cornelia C. Contralto II in The Magic School Bus episode "In the Haunted House", herself in the Family Guy episode "Patriot Games"), dies at age 97.
 Bradley Bolke, American voice actor (voice of Chumley the Walrus in Underdog), dies at age 93.
 January 26: Michel Legrand, French composer (The Smurfs and the Magic Flute), dies at age 86.
 January 27: Erica Yohn, American actress (voice of Mama Mousekewitz in An American Tail), dies at age 90.
 January 30: Dick Miller, American actor (voice of Boxy Bennett in Batman: The Animated Series, Chuckie Sol in Batman: Mask of the Phantasm, Oberon in the Justice League Unlimited episode "The Ties That Bind"), dies at age 90.

February
 February 6: Trista H. Navarro, American production manager (The Simpsons, The Simpsons Movie), dies at age 43.
 February 7: Ted Stearn, American comic book artist, animator, storyboard artist (Beavis and Butt-Head Do America, Daria, Downtown, Drawn Together, King of the Hill, Squirrel Boy, Sit Down, Shut Up, Futurama, Rick and Morty, Animals.) and director (Daria, Beavis and Butt-Head), dies from AIDS at age 58.
 February 9: 
 Ron W. Miller, American businessman, film producer, football player and president and CEO of The Walt Disney Company from 1978 to 1984, dies at age 85.
 Tomi Ungerer, French novelist, illustrator, cartoonist and poster designer (narrator in The Three Robbers and The Moon Man), dies at age 87.
 C. Raggio IV, American character designer (Cartoon Network Studios, The Mighty B!, Disney Television Animation) and storyboard artist (The Replacements, Illumination, The Angry Birds Movie 2), dies from blunt trauma at age 40.
 February 15: 
 Werner Hierl, German comics artist (Rolf Kauka), and animator (Bavaria Film), dies at age 88 or 89.
 Dave Smith, American archivist (founder of the Walt Disney Archives) and author (Disney A to Z), dies at age 78.
 February 21: Antonia Rey, Cuban-born American actress (portrayed Assunta Bianchi in Happy!, voice of Abuela and Wizzles in Dora the Explorer, additional voices in Courage the Cowardly Dog), dies at age 92.
 February 23: Katherine Helmond, American actress (voice of Lizzie in the Cars franchise, Connie Stromwell in the Batman: The Animated Series episode "It's Never Too Late", Dugong in The Wild Thornberrys episode "Reef Grief"), dies at age 89.
 February 28: Aron Tager, American actor (voice of Cranky Kong in Donkey Kong Country, King Allfire in Blazing Dragons, additional voices in The Busy World of Richard Scarry and The Adventures of Sam & Max: Freelance Police), dies at age 84.

March
 March 4: Luke Perry, American actor (voice of Napoleon Brie in Biker Mice from Mars, Sub-Zero in Mortal Kombat: Defenders of the Realm, Rick Jones in The Incredible Hulk, Stewart Waldinger in Pepper Ann, Ponce de Leon in the Clone High episode "Litter Kills: Litterally", Jacob in the Generator Rex episode "The Architect", Fang in the Pound Puppies episode "Rebel Without a Collar", voiced himself in The Simpsons episode "Krusty Gets Kancelled", the Family Guy episode "The Story on Page One", and the Johnny Bravo episode "Luke Perry's Guide to Love"), dies from a stroke at age 52.
 March 7: Rosto, Dutch animator and film director (The Monster of Nix, No Place Like Home, Lonely Bones, Splintertime), dies at age 50.
 March 16: 
 Tom Hatten, American cartoonist, TV presenter (host of The Popeye Show) and actor (voice of Farmer Fitzgibbons in The Secret of NIMH), dies at age 92.
 Larry DiTillio, American film and television screenwriter (Fat Albert and the Cosby Kids, He-Man and the Masters of the Universe, Beast Wars), dies at age 79.
 March 28: Maury Laws, American composer (Rankin/Bass), dies at age 95.
 March 31: Don Morgan, American animator (UPA, Chuck Jones, Walt Disney Animation, Bakshi Animation, Hanna-Barbera) and comics artist, dies at age 80.

April
 April 7: Seymour Cassel, American actor (voice of Chuck Sirianni in the Justice League Unlimited episode "I Am Legion", Man in Panda Suit in the Gary the Rat episode "Manratten"), dies at age 84.
 April 11: Monkey Punch, Japanese manga artist (creator of Lupin III), dies at age 81.
 April 12: Georgia Engel, American actress (voice of Love-a-Lot Bear in The Care Bears Movie, Bobbie in the Open Season franchise, Evelyn in Hercules, Willow Song in The Magic of Herself the Elf, Old Woman in the Hey Arnold! episode "Bag of Money", Rose in the Unsupervised episode "Youngbloods"), dies at age 70.
 April 23: Edward Kelsey, English voice actor (voice of Colonel K. and Baron Silas Greenback in Danger Mouse, Mr. Growbag in Wallace and Gromit: The Curse of the Were-Rabbit), dies at age 88.
 April 28: Bruce Bickford, American animator (made the surreal clay-animated sequences in Frank Zappa's concert films The Dub Room Special, Baby Snakes and The Amazing Mr. Bickford), dies at age 72.
 April 30: Peter Mayhew, English-American actor (voice of Chewbacca in Star Wars: The Clone Wars), dies at age 74.

May
 May 2: Chris Reccardi, American animator (The New Adventures of Beany and Cecil, The Butter Battle Book, Tiny Toon Adventures, The Simpsons, The Ren & Stimpy Show, Hercules and Xena - The Animated Movie: The Battle for Mount Olympus, Cloudy with a Chance of Meatballs, The Lego Movie, designed the end credits sequence of Hotel Transylvania 3: Summer Vacation), storyboard artist (Tiny Toon Adventures, Nickelodeon Animation Studio, Universal Cartoon Studios, Cow and Chicken, I Am Weasel, Dilbert, Cartoon Network Studios, DreamWorks Animation, The Haunted World of El Superbeasto, The Ricky Gervais Show, Kick Buttowski: Suburban Daredevil, Tron: Uprising, The Mighty Ones), character designer (Wander Over Yonder, Samurai Jack), background artist (Foster's Home for Imaginary Friends, Mickey Mouse), graphic designer, musician, writer (The Ren & Stimpy Show, Cartoon Network Studios, SpongeBob SquarePants, Billy Dilley's Super-Duper Subterranean Summer), director (The Ren & Stimpy Show, Super Robot Monkey Team Hyperforce Go!) and producer (Regular Show), dies from a heart attack at age 54.
 May 13: Hu Jinqing, Chinese animator and director (The Fight Between the Snipe and the Clam, Calabash Brothers), dies at age 83.
 May 14: Tim Conway, American actor and comedian (voice of Barnacle Boy in SpongeBob SquarePants, himself in The Simpsons episode "The Simpsons Spin-Off Showcase" and The New Scooby-Doo Movies episode "The Spirit Spooked Sports Show"), dies at age 85.
 May 22: Flaminia Jandolo, Italian voice actress (dub voice of Lady in Lady and the Tramp, Merryweather in Sleeping Beauty and Perdita in One Hundred and One Dalmatians), dies at age 89.
 May 30: Milan Blažeković, Croatian animator (The Elm-Chanted Forest, The Magician's Hat, Lapitch the Little Shoemaker), dies at age 78.

June
 June 6: Dr. John, American singer and songwriter (voice of The Sun in Whoopi's Littleburg, performed the theme songs of Whoopi's Littleburg and Curious George), dies from a heart attack at age 77.
 June 7: Nonnie Griffin, Canadian actress (voice of Funshine Bear in Care Bears, Harmony Bear in Care Bears Movie II: A New Generation, Shadu in Ewoks, Pepper Potts, Black Widow, and Enchantress in The Marvel Super Heroes), dies at age 85.
 June 18: Milton Quon, American animator (Walt Disney Animation Studios), artist and actor, dies at age 104.
 June 28: Kaj Pindal, Danish-Canadian comics artist and animator (What on Earth!, Peep and the Big Wide World), dies at age 91.
 June 30: Guillermo Mordillo, Argentine cartoonist and animator (Estudios Galas, produced animated shorts based on his cartoons), dies at age 86.

July
 July 1: Dennis Snee, American screenwriter (wrote The Simpsons episode "Special Edna"), dies at age 68.
 July 3: Arte Johnson, American comic actor (voice of Tyrone in Baggy Pants and the Nitwits, Farquad and Skull Ghost in Scooby-Doo Meets the Boo Brothers, Devil Smurf in The Smurfs, Weerd in The 13 Ghosts of Scooby-Doo, Count Ray and Dr. Ludwig von Strangeduck in DuckTales, Newt in Animaniacs, Virman Vundabar in the Justice League Unlimited episode "The Ties That Bind"), dies at age 90.
 July 6: Cameron Boyce, American actor (voice of Jake in seasons 2-3 of Jake and the Never Land Pirates, Carlos in Descendants: Wicked World, Luke Ross in the Ultimate Spider-Man episode "Halloween Night at the Museum", Shocker in the  Spider-Man episode "Osborn Academy"), dies at age 20.
 July 9: 
 Freddie Jones, English actor (voice of Dallben in The Black Cauldron), dies at age 91.
 Rip Torn, American actor (voice of Zeus in the Hercules franchise, Lou De Luca in Bee Movie, M in the TripTank episode "#InsideRoy"), dies from complications from Alzheimer's disease at age 88.
 July 11: Pepita Pardell, Spanish animator, cartoonist, illustrator and painter (worked for Balet y Blay), dies at age 91.
 July 18:
 Naomi Ishida, Japanese color designer (The Melancholy of Haruhi Suzumiya, A Silent Voice) and member of Kyoto Animation, dies at age 49 in the Kyoto Animation arson attack.
 Yoshiji Kigami, Japanese director (MUNTO), animator (Akira, A Silent Voice), and member of Kyoto Animation, dies at age 61 in the Kyoto Animation arson attack.
 Futoshi Nishiya, Japanese character designer (Free!, A Silent Voice), animator (Clannad, The Melancholy of Haruhi Suzumiya), and member of Kyoto Animation, dies at age 37 in the Kyoto Animation arson attack.
 Yasuhiro Takemoto, Japanese director (The Disappearance of Haruhi Suzumiya, Hyouka) and member of Kyoto Animation, dies at age 47 in the Kyoto Animation arson attack.
 July 23: Gabe Khouth, Canadian voice actor (voice of Nicol Amalfi in Gundam SEED, Goten in the Ocean dub of Dragon Ball Z, Orko and Mekaneck in He-Man and the Masters of the Universe, Spinner Cortez in Hot Wheels Battle Force 5), dies at age 47.
 July 26: Russi Taylor, American voice actress (voice of Gonzo, Camilla and Robin in Muppet Babies, Huey, Dewey, and Louie and Webby Vanderquack in DuckTales, Phantasma in Scooby-Doo and the Ghoul School and the OK K.O.! Let's Be Heroes episode "Monster Party", Martin Prince, Üter, and Sherri and Terri in The Simpsons, Widget in Widget the World Watcher, Ferny Toro and Annie Winks in Jakers! The Adventures of Piggley Winks, young Donald Duck in the DuckTales episode "Last Christmas!", continued voice of Minnie Mouse and Pebbles Flintstone), dies from cancer-related complications at age 75.
 July 29: Daniele Fagarazzi, AKA Dani, Italian animator and comic artist (worked on Arrivano i Putti-Potti), dies at age 54.

August
 August 4: Stu Rosen, American voice director and actor (Hulk Hogan's Rock 'n' Wrestling, The Legend of Prince Valiant, Fraggle Rock: The Animated Series), dies at age 80 from cancer.
 August 16: Richard Williams, Canadian-English animator and director (The Thief and the Cobbler, directed the animated scenes in What's New Pussycat?, A Funny Thing Happened on the Way to the Forum, Casino Royale, The Charge of the Light Brigade, Can Heironymus Merkin Ever Forget Mercy Humppe and Find True Happiness?, The Return of the Pink Panther, The Pink Panther Strikes Again and Who Framed Roger Rabbit), dies from cancer at age 86.
 August 21: Richard Trueblood, American animator (Hanna-Barbera, The Nine Lives of Fritz the Cat, The Mouse and His Child, A Family Circus Christmas, Filmation), storyboard artist (Maxie's World, Goof Troop, Sonic the Hedgehog, Bonkers), sheet timer (Little Nemo: Adventures in Slumberland, Disney Television Animation, DuckTales the Movie: Treasure of the Lost Lamp, Animaniacs, DIC Entertainment, The Incredible Hulk, Adelaide Productions, All Dogs Go to Heaven: The Series, Histeria!, The Secret of NIMH 2: Timmy to the Rescue, The Wild Thornberrys, The New Woody Woodpecker Show, The Oblongs, Courage the Cowardly Dog, Clifford's Really Big Movie), producer (Attack of the Killer Tomatoes, Space Cats, Bonkers, Fantastic Four) and director (Filmation, Garbage Pail Kids, Teenage Mutant Ninja Turtles, Disney Television Animation, Biker Mice from Mars, Iron Man, The Incredible Hulk, Dexter's Laboratory), dies at age 78.
 August 22: Dwi Koendoro, Indonesian comics artist, animator (made an animated series based on his comics series Legenda Sawung Kampret) and film producer (head of Indonesian Animation Association), dies at age 78.
 August 27: Pedro Bell, American illustrator, animator and comics artist (once made an animated short starring his character Larry Lazer), dies at age 69.
 August 30:
 Valerie Harper, American actress (voice of various characters in The Simpsons, Townspeople in the Sorcerous Stabber Orphen episode "The Sword of Baltanders", Maryellen and Librarian in the As Told by Ginger episode "The Wedding Frame", IHOP Diner in the American Dad! episode "Cock of the Sleepwalk", additional voices in Generator Gawl), dies from lung cancer at age 80.
 Gordon Bressack, American television producer and writer (Hanna-Barbera, Bionic Six, DuckTales, DIC Entertainment, Warner Bros. Animation, Teenage Mutant Ninja Turtles, Darkwing Duck, Mighty Max, Fat Dog Mendoza, The Adventures of Jimmy Neutron, Boy Genius, WordGirl, The Twisted Whiskers Show, Octonauts, creator of Captain Simian & the Space Monkeys), dies at age 68.
 August 31: Michael Lindsay, American voice actor (voice of Kisuke Urahara in Bleach, Shinichiro Tamaki in Code Geass), dies at age 56.

September
 September 4:
 Dai Tielang, Singaporean-Chinese animator and film director (Black Cat Detective, A Deer of Nine Colors, Where is Mama), dies at age 88.
 Ernie Elicanal, American animator and storyboard artist (Scooby-Doo! and the Reluctant Werewolf, The Rugrats Movie, The Wild Thornberrys Movie, Tutenstein, The Simpsons Movie, The Simpsons), dies at an unknown age.
 September 7: Robert Axelrod, American actor (voice of Lord Zedd and Finster in Mighty Morphin Power Rangers, Microchip in Spider-Man, Wizardmon and Vademon in Digimon: Digital Monsters), dies at age 70.
 September 13: Eddie Money, American singer and songwriter (performed the theme song of Quack Pack, composed the tracks "Baby Hold On" which was used in the Bob's Burgers episode "O.T.: The Outside Toilet", and "Two Tickets to Paradise" which was used in The Simpsons episode "Homer Loves Flanders" and the King of the Hill episode "Enrique-cilable Differences"), dies from esophageal cancer at age 70.
 September 22: J. Michael Mendel, American television producer (The Simpsons, The Critic, The PJs, The Oblongs, Kid Notorious, Drawn Together, Lil' Bush, Sit Down, Shut Up, Good Vibes, Napoleon Dynamite, Rick and Morty, Solar Opposites), dies at age 54.
 September 30: Marshall Efron, American actor (voice of Ratso in The Kwicky Koala Show, Sloppy Smurf in The Smurfs, Mooch in The Biskitts, Fat Cat in Kidd Video, Stanley in Fluppy Dogs, Hun-Gurrr in The Transformers, Deputroll Flake in Trollkins, Synonamess Botch in Twice Upon a Time), dies at age 81.

October
 October 2: Alan Zaslove, American animator and animation producer (UPA, Hanna-Barbera, Walt Disney Animation Studios), dies at age 91.
 October 6: Rip Taylor, American actor and comedian (voice of The Grump in Here Comes The Grump, Gene the Genie in DuckTales the Movie: Treasure of the Lost Lamp,  Uncle Fester in The Addams Family, and Captain Kiddie in Tom and Jerry: The Movie), dies at age 89.
 October 11:
 Robert Forster, American actor (voice of Major Forsberg in Todd McFarlane's Spawn, The President in Justice League Unlimited, Jack J. Kurtzman in Teenage Mutant Ninja Turtles, Jack Chapman and Police Officer in the Godzilla: The Series episode "Wedding Bells Blew", Lucky Jim in The Simpsons episode "Sex, Pies and Idiot Scrapes", General Bryce in the Transformers: Prime episode "Grill"), dies from brain cancer at age 78.
 Ram Mohan, Indian animator (You Said It, Fire Games), director (co-director of Ramayana: The Legend of Prince Rama, Meena) and animation producer (Ram Mohan Biographics), dies at age 88.
 October 21: Bengt Feldreich, Swedish television presentator, journalist and voice actor (the narrator in From All of Us to All of You), dies at age 94.
 October 22: Craig Gardner, American background artist (Wild West C.O.W.-Boys of Moo Mesa, Mega Man, Iron Man, Fantastic Four, Darkstalkers, The Real Adventures of Jonny Quest, Captain Simian & the Space Monkeys, Scooby-Doo on Zombie Island, Nickelodeon Animation Studio, RoboCop: Alpha Commando, Harvey Birdman, Attorney at Law, Ozzy & Drix, Tom and Jerry: The Fast and the Furry), dies at an unknown age.
 October 26: Robert Evans, American film producer, studio executive and actor (co-creator, producer and voice of the title character in Kid Notorious, himself in The Simpsons episode "Kill the Alligator and Run"), dies at age 89.
 October 29: John Witherspoon, American actor and comedian (voice of Dad in Waynehead, Oran Jones in The Proud Family, Robert Freeman in The Boondocks, S. Ward Smith in Randy Cunningham: 9th Grade Ninja, Scofflaw in the Happily Ever After: Fairy Tales for Every Child episode "The Prince and the Pauper", Wayne in the Kim Possible episode "Rewriting History", Jimmy in the Animals episode "Squirrels", Franco Aplenty in the BoJack Horseman episode "Surprise"), dies from a heart attack at age 77.

November
 November 5: Laurel Griggs, American child actress (voice of Stella, Crab Sprout 1 & 2 and Crab Kid in Bubble Guppies), dies from an undiagnosed asthma attack at age 13.

December
 December 8: 
 René Auberjonois, American actor (voice of Chef Louis in The Little Mermaid, the Skull in The Last Unicorn, DeSaad in Super Friends, Mark Desmond in Young Justice, Azmuth in Ben 10: Omniverse, Ebony Maw in Avengers Assemble), dies from lung cancer at age 79.
 Caroll Spinney, American puppeteer (Sesame Street), voice actor, comics artist and animator (Crazy Crayons), dies at age 85.
 December 12: Albert Jelenic, Croatian-born American voice actor and father of Michael Jelenic (voiced himself in the Teen Titans Go! episodes "The Self-Indulgent 200th Episode Spectacular", "The Power of Shrimps", and "Where Exactly on the Globe Is Carl Sanpedro"), dies at age 75.
 December 14: Lord Tim Hudson, English DJ and voice actor (voice of Dizzy in The Jungle Book, Hit Cat in The Aristocats), dies at age 79.
 December 25: 
 Patricia Alice Albrecht, American actress, writer and poet (voice of Phyllis "Pizzazz" Gabor in Jem), dies at age 66.
 Lee Mendelson, American animation producer (Peanuts, Here Comes Garfield, Garfield on the Town, The Romance of Betty Boop, Garfield and Friends), dies from lung cancer at age 86.
 December 27: Jack Sheldon, American jazz trumpeter, singer (Schoolhouse Rock!, performed the song "Take the Money and Run" in Teacher's Pet) and actor (voice of The Sensitive Male, The President, Chef and Traffic Cop in Johnny Bravo, The Amendment in The Simpsons episode "The Day the Violence Died", 'Vagina Junction' Conductor and The Bill in the Family Guy episodes "Running Mates" and "Mr. Griffin Goes to Washington"), dies at age 88.

See also
 2019 in anime
 List of animated television series of 2019

Notes

References

External links 
Animated works of the year, listed in the IMDb

 
2010s in animation
Mass media timelines by year
Animation